Hans Timmermann (1926–2005) was a German television actor.

Television appearances
 Sir Roger Casement
 Tatort
 Madame Caillaux
 Hamburg Transit

External links
 

1926 births
2005 deaths
German male television actors
People from Flensburg